Mona Ghaderi (Persian: مونا قادری, born May 24, 1980) is an Iranian former professional volleyball player and the current manager of Iran's national women's paddle team.

Career 
Ghaderi started playing football at a young age and was later invited to the national volleyball team. After participating in the Iranian Volleyball league, she turned to paddle sport in 2015. She is currently heading the national paddle team of Iran after receiving first-class certification. In 2022, she was appointed as the deputy chairwoman of the Women Paddle Association of Iran.

Personal life 
Her father is Khosrow Ghaderi, who was an athlete and volleyball coach.

References 

Living people
1980 births
Iranian women's volleyball players